Bettye Washington Greene (March 20, 1935 – June 16, 1995) was an American industrial research chemist. She was the first African American female Ph.D. chemist to work in a professional position at the Dow Chemical Company. At Dow, she researched latex and polymers. Dr. Greene is considered an early African American pioneer in science.

Early life and education 

Bettye Washington was born in Fort Worth, Texas. She attended segregated public schools and graduated from I.M. Terrell High School around 1952.

She entered Tuskegee Institute in Alabama, graduating with a B.S. in chemistry in 1955. Following her marriage to Veteran Air force Captain William Miller Greene in July of 1955, she attended Wayne State University in Detroit, Michigan, where she earned her Ph.D. in physical chemistry working with Wilfred Heller (1962). She also taught undergraduate chemistry at this time. Her doctoral dissertation, "Determination of particle size distributions in emulsions by light scattering" was published in 1965.

She was elected to Sigma Xi, the Scientific Research Society.

Career

Dow Chemical 

In 1965, Greene joined the Dow Chemical Company's E. C. Britton Research Laboratory in Midland, Michigan.  She was the first African-American woman to join the company in a professional position. Dr. Greene served as a Consultant on Polymers issues in the Saran Research Laboratory and the Styrene Butadiene (SB) Latex group often utilized her expertise and knowledge. At Dow, she researched colloid and latex chemistry, including interactions between latex and paper.

In 1970, Dr. Greene was promoted to senior research chemist at Dow Chemical. In 1973, she joined Dow Chemical's Designed Polymers Research Division, again working with latex, to find polymers that could improve latex. She was subsequently promoted to the position of senior research specialist in 1975. She continued to work for Dow Chemical until her retirement in 1990. She published several papers studying different properties that lend to the redispersement of latex. She also published work studying methodologies for determining the surface tension of liquids or solutions. She left Dow Chemical in 1990.

Dr. Greene filed for several patents during her career at Dow Chemical. In 1985, she was issued a patent entitled "Stable latexes containing phosphorus surface groups" describing a method of preparing a paper coating composition comprising the addition of from about 2 to about 30 percent of a modified latex containing phosphorus surface groups. In 1986, she was issued a follow-up patent entitled "Composite sheet prepared with stable latexes containing phosphorus surface groups" also employing emulsion polymerization techniques for preparing modified latex. In 1990, Dr. Greene was issued a patent entitled "Latex based adhesive prepared by emulsion polymerization" for the invention of a latex based pressure sensitive adhesive for coating conventional substrates to form an adhesive tape.

After decades of contribution to the science of polymers, she died in Midland on June 16, 1995.

Philanthropy

Greene was a charter member of the Midland, Michigan Alumni Chapter of the Delta Sigma Theta sorority, a national public service group emphasizing work with African American women.  The Midland chapter was chartered in 1984.

Patents 
Greene held a number of patents including a latex-based adhesive using a carboxylic acid copolymerizing agent, and latex polymers with phosphates used as coatings:

 4968740: Latex-based adhesive prepared by emulsion polymerization
 4609434: Composite sheet prepared with stable latexes containing phosphorus surface groups
 4506057: Stable latexes containing phosphorus surface groups

References 

17. cause of death???

External links
 
 List and overview of Greene's patents
 A summary of Greene's Doctoral Dissertation published in Scientific and Technical Aerospace Reports

American physical chemists
Polymer scientists and engineers
Tuskegee University alumni
Wayne State University alumni
1935 births
1995 deaths
People from Fort Worth, Texas
Dow Chemical Company employees
Delta Sigma Theta members
American women chemists
20th-century American women scientists
Academics from Texas
20th-century African-American women
20th-century African-American scientists